August is both a given name and surname developed from the Latin, Augustus. Derived from the Latin word augere, meaning "to increase", Augustus had the meaning "esteemed" or "venerable" and was a title given to Roman emperors.

Persons with the given name August 
August, Duke of Saxe-Merseburg-Zörbig (1655–1715), German prince
August, Duke of Schleswig-Holstein-Sonderburg-Beck (1652–1689), German noble
August, Prince of Hohenlohe-Öhringen (1784–1853), German noble and general of the Napoleonic Wars
August Aichhorn (1878–1949), Austrian educator and psychoanalyst
August Alle (1890–1952), Estonian writer
August Allebé (1838–1927), Dutch painter
August Alsina (born 1992), American singer
August Ames (1994–2017), American adult film actress
August Annist (1899–1972), Estonian literary and folklore scholar, writer and translator
August Bebel (1840–1913), German social-democrat
August Blom (1869–1947), Danish film director
August Bogusch (1890–1948), German SS officer at Auschwitz executed for war crimes
August Bournonville (1805–1879), Danish ballet master and choreographer
August Brooksbank (born 2021), son of Princess Eugenie of York and Jack Brooksbank
August Coppola (1934–2009), American academic
August Dvorak (1894–1975), American educational psychologist and professor
August Eigruber (1907–1947), Austrian-born Nazi hanged for war crimes
August Getty (born 1994), American fashion designer
August Horch (1868−1951), German engineer and automobile pioneer, the founder of the manufacturing giant which would eventually become Audi
August Jakobson (1904–1963), Estonian writer and politician
August Jerndorff (1846–1906), Danish painter
August Kastra (1878–1941), Estonian journalist and a trade union leader
August Kippasto (1887–1973), Estonian wrestler
August Kitzberg (1855–1927), Estonian writer
August Kleinzahler (born 1949), American poet
August Krogh (1874–1949), Danish professor
August Kohver (1889–1942), Estonian agronomist and politician
August Kubizek (1888–1956), Austrian composer, early friend of Adolf Hitler
August Kukk (1908–1988), Estonian wrestler
August Lass (1903–1962), Estonian footballer
August Leskien (1840–1916), German linguist
August Liivik (1903–1942), Estonian sport shooter
August Gustafsson Lohaprasert (born 1993), Thai footballer
 August von Mackensen (1849–1945), German field marshal
August Mälk (1900–1987), Estonian writer and politician
August Maramaa (1881–1941), Estonian politician
August Meyszner (1886–1947), Austrian Nazi SS officer executed for war crimes
August S. Narumi (1919–1994), American-Japanese Bronze Wolf recipient
August Neo (1908–1982), Estonian wrestler
August Oberhauser (1895–1971), Swiss footballer
August Pikker (1889–1976), Estonian wrestler
August Rei (1886–1963), Estonian politician
August Saabye (1823–1916), Danish sculptor
August Sang (1914–1969), Estonian poet and literary translator
August Sangret (1913–1943), Canadian soldier executed for murder
August Schellenberg (1936–2013), Canadian First Nation actor
August Schmidhuber (1901–1947), German Nazi SS officer executed for war crimes
August Spies (1855–1887), American anarchist
August Strindberg (1849–1912), Swedish writer, playwright and painter
August Traksmaa (1893–1942), Estonian Army General and diplomat
August Vaga (1893–1960), Estonian botanist
August Volberg (1896–1982), Estonian architect and educator
August Warberg (1842–1915), Swedish actor
August Weismann (1834–1914), German evolutionary biologist
August Wesley (1887–1942), Finnish journalist, trade unionist and revolutionary
August Wilson (1945–2005), American playwright
August Winding (1835–1899), Danish pianist and composer

Persons with the surname August
Bille August (born 1948), Danish film director
Carl August (disambiguation), the name of several people
Edward August (1860–1935), member of the Legislative Assembly of Manitoba from 1915 to 1922
Ernest August (disambiguation), the name of several people
John August (born 1970), American screenwriter
Joseph August, American Cinematographer 
Leo August (1914–1997), American philatelist, stamp dealer and publisher
Pernilla August (born 1958), Swedish actress, married to Bille August
Tyler August (born 1983), American politician
Alba August (born 1993), Danish-born Swedish actress and singer

Fictional characters
Dan August, fictional detective played by actor Burt Reynolds
 August, character from Tales from the Borderlands
 August Horn of Årnäs, character from Young Royals

Masculine variants 
Ágastas (Irish)
Ágost (Hungarian)
Agostino (Italian)
Ágúst (Icelandic) 
Águstas (Irish)
Agusto (Spanish)
Ağustos (Turkish)
Aogust (Breton)
August (Catalan, Danish, English, Estonian, German, Norwegian, Polish, Swedish)
Augustas (Lithuanian)
Auguste (French)
Augusti (Albanian)
Augusto (Italian, Portuguese, Spanish)
Augusts (Latvian)
Agustinus (Indonesian)
Augustu (Sicilian)
Augustus (Dutch, Latin)
Aukusti (Finnish)
Austu (Sardinian)
Ávgos (Sami)
Avgust (Slovenian)
Awgust (Sorbian)
Августин (Avgustin, Avhust) (Bulgarian, Macedonian, Russian, Serbian, Ukrainian)
Αύγουστος (Avgoustos) (Greek)
אוגוסטוס (Hebrew)

Diminutive and pet forms 
Agge (Swedish)
Ago (Estonian)
Aku (Finnish)
Augi (German)
Augie (English)
Auke (Frisian)
Ësti (Luxembourgish)
Gus (English, Scottish)
Gusse (Danish)
Gust (Luxembourgish)
Gusta (Czech)
Gustek (Slovenian)
Gustík (Czech)
Gustelj (Slovenian)
Gusti (Luxembourgish, German, Slovenian)
Guto (Portuguese)
Gustl (German, Slovenian)
Guus (Dutch)
Kusti (Finnish)

Feminine variants
Ágústa (Icelandic) 
August (English)
Augusta (Danish, Dutch, English, Italian, Polish, Portuguese, Hungarian)
Auguste (English, German, French)
Augustė (Lithuanian)
Augustia (English)
Agustina (Indonesian)
Auguszta (Hungarian)
Avgusta (Slovenian)

Diminutive and pet forms 
Aukje (Frisian)
Gussie (English)
Gusta (Dutch)
Guusje (Dutch)
Gussy (German)
Gus
Auggie

See also
 Augustus
 Augustine

References

Masculine given names
Danish masculine given names
Estonian masculine given names
German masculine given names
Swedish masculine given names
English masculine given names
Finnish masculine given names